Acer negundo 'Pendulum', or weeping boxelder maple, is a weeping tree and a cultivar of Acer negundo, the boxelder maple. It was first described by Fritz Kurt Alexander von Schwerin in 1896. No trees are known to survive of this cultivar.

Description
A weeping tree without a true leader and with perpendicular branches forming an umbrella shape. When top grafted it looks similar to Fraxinus excelsior 'Pendula'.

Accessions
This cultivar does not seem to have been cultivated outside Germany. No trees are known to survive.

Synonymy
Acer negundo pendulum Schwer.(1896)

References

negundo Pendulum
Weeping trees
Extinct cultivars

pms:Acer platanoides